Helton may refer to:
 Helton, Cumbria, a village in England
 Helton, Kentucky, United States
 Helton, Missouri, United States
 Helton Township, Ashe County, North Carolina, USA
 Helton, North Carolina, an unincorporated community in Helton Township
 Helton (name), an English surname from the village of Elton, Cheshire, England.
 Heltonville, Indiana, United States

See also
 Helton Creek Falls